2009 Denmark Open is a darts tournament, which took place in Denmark in 2009.

Results

Last 32

References

2009 in darts
2009 in Danish sport
Darts in Denmark